Charlotte Hudson (born 4 January 1972) is an English actress and television presenter. Hudson was born in Sheffield. Her brother is actor Robert Hudson. She also has two younger sisters: Laura and Lydia.

Education and early career
After attending Fitzwilliam College, Cambridge, Hudson started in television co-presenting Watchdog with Anne Robinson.

She presented the Sky One television series Brainiac: History Abuse, a spin-off from the award-winning Brainiac: Science Abuse, which she also co-presented. Hudson has also appeared as an actress in various UK TV shows. She regularly appeared as a guest on Big Brother's Little Brother and Big Brother's Big Mouth. Hudson also appeared in the sketch show Bruiser  opposite  Mitchell & Webb, Olivia Colman, Martin Freeman and Matthew Holness.

Career
In summer 2009, Hudson  provided the in-game voiceover for the ITV show Divided.  Between 2010 and 2012, she narrated the ITVBe programme Dinner Date.

Hudson was one half of comedy sketch double act Two Left Hands with comedian Leila Hackett, performing at the Edinburgh Festival Fringe in August 2007 and 2009.

External links

Two Left Hands – Charlotte Hudson and Leila Hackett's live comedy sketch group

British television presenters
Living people
Alumni of Fitzwilliam College, Cambridge
Actresses from Sheffield
1972 births